Bethlehem Central High School is a public high school in Delmar, New York, just south of Albany. Located at 700 Delaware Avenue, the school serves students in grades 9–12 from the towns of Bethlehem and New Scotland. The school was ranked 366 on Newsweek's 2013 "America's Best High Schools".

History
The school was established in 1932 at 332 Kenwood Avenue. Within 20 years, the original building was deemed too small, and the school moved to its current location in 1954. (The former building now serves as the district's middle school although it still bears the inscription "Bethlehem Central High School".)

In 2006, the school forbade students to wear hats, hoods, bandannas, and handkerchiefs, saying that these can be gang symbols. This policy was met with considerable student protest, culminating in a petition that accumulated more than 1000 signatures in one day along with the addition of a permanent gate station to the school. The issue drew coverage in the Times Union and local television news formats.

Extracurricular activities
The school's Science Bowl team finished first in their regional competition in 2006, 2009, 2010, 2013, 2015, 2016, 2017, 2018, 2019, 2021 earning them trips to the national competition in Washington, DC. 
Bethlehem students have also performed well in the Science Olympiad Tournaments, placing first in their regional competition and ninth at the New York States competition in 2021.

Bethlehem Central High School has produced excellent Masterminds teams that have won several championships in their league.  The Bethlehem Masterminds team won the state tournament in 2006, 2010, 2013, 2014, 2015, 2016, and 2017, making it the only team to have won states five years in a row.

Bethlehem students have also consistently performed well at the National History Bowl, having placed highly in its national championship each year since 2012. However, the History Bowl team is not funded by the school. Members of the History Bowl team have also done well at all-subject Quizbowl events, having won several in the 2014–15 school year.

Athletics
Bethlehem Central School District believes that sports foster education, and supports more than 20 sports across three seasons. The district belongs to the New York State Athletic Association and competes as a Class AA school in Section II. BC's league affiliation is with the Suburban Scholastic Council, in which it competes in the gold division.

The Eagles compete in the following sports:

Baseball
Men's and Women's Basketball
Men's and Women's Bowling
Cheerleading
Men's and Women's Cross Country
Field Hockey
Football
Gymnastics
Men's Golf
Ice Hockey
Men's and Women's Indoor Track
Men's and Women's Lacrosse
Men's and Women's Soccer
Softball
Men's and Women's Swimming
Men's and Women's Tennis
Men's and Women's Track
Men's and Women's Volleyball
Men's Wrestling
Masterminds (Brain Sport)
Science Bowl (Brain Sport)
Science Olympiad (Brain Sport)
Ultimate Frisbee

On June 20, 2006, funds for Ice Hockey, Cheerleading, and Gymnastics were cut from the budget. Supporters held multiple fund raisers for the teams, allowing all of them to play their sports by the season. The 2007 budget restored funding for these teams.

In 2006, the boys' soccer team made the Final 4 in the state championship. Four members of the girls' swim team made the state championship as well, placing 3rd in the 200-yard Medley Relay. That same year's boys' 200 freestyle relay was ranked 2nd in New York State and named All American.

The boys' Indoor and Outdoor Track teams are recognized as one of the best in the suburban council. In 2010, the boys Indoor Track team sent five athletes to the Nike Indoor Nationals in Boston.

Bethlehem Athletics has seen a rejuvenation in recent years. In 2018 the boys ice hockey team claimed the first section 2 title in program history following it up with a second consecutive title in 2019. The ice hockey team is joined by the boys tennis team (section 2 champions in '18 and '19) as well as girls soccer (section 2 champions in '18 and '19) as teams to capture back to back titles for the school. The girl's tennis team has claimed two back to back sectional championships, in 2021 and 2022. In 2021, the girl's tennis team competed for a States title, but finished 3rd in New York State. In 2022, the girl's tennis team placed 2nd in New York State.

Lab School
Founded by James Nehring in 1992, the Lab School of Bethlehem Central High School is a school-within-a-school with a total of about 111 students in grades 9 through 12.  Senior students participate in an internship, which must meet various educational requirements set by the school; they keep journals of their hours and experiences and hand it in at the end of the year for a grade.

Each year, the Lab School takes several field trips. Destinations include the Capital Repertory Theater in Albany and the Adirondack Mountains YMCA Camps Chingachgook and Silver Bay.  Each spring, the school takes a trip to either Williamsburg, Virginia; Washington, D.C.; Boston; or Philadelphia.  Every two years, juniors and seniors take a week-long trip to the Florida Keys or Costa Rica to learn about marine biology.

Notable alumni

Hall of Fame
Alumni recognized by the school for induction into its hall of fame include:
Dr. Richard Jadick (1983), an osteopathic physician, completed a combat tour of duty in Iraq during 2004-05 as a lieutenant commander in the U.S. Navy Reserve; Jadick saved the lives of more than 30 Marines who were wounded during combat in Falluja, Iraq, and in January 2006, received the Bronze Star with “Combat V” device for heroic valor
Megyn Kelly (1988), Former host of Megyn Kelly Today a part of The Today Show on NBC. She is also a former Fox News anchor, and was featured on the cover of Vanity Fair
 Loretta Preska (1966), Senior United States district judge of the United States District Court for the Southern District of New York
Matt Quatraro (1992), baseball player, coach, and manager
Neal Shapiro (1976), former president of NBC News, where he oversaw global operations of NBC’s News division and news operations of MSNBC; won a George Polk Award, two Emmy awards and an Investigative Reporters and Editors award
Eva Marie Saint (1942), actress who won an Oscar for Best Supporting Actress for her role in On the Waterfront (1954); she also starred in North by Northwest and other films, and has continued to work in movies and television into her 90s
Gerald Solomon (1948), chairman of the United States House Committee on Ways and Means

Others
Robyn Adele Anderson (2007), singer in Postmodern Jukebox
 James Charles (2017), Internet personality and makeup artist,
 Bill Karins (1992), NBC meteorologist
 Ed O'Keefe, reporter for CBS News and previously The Washington Post 
 Stephen G. Olmstead (1947), retired Lieutenant general in the Marine Corps
 Chris Porco (2002), convicted murderer
 Gary Samore (1971), WMD Czar From 2009 to 2013, he served as President Barack Obama's White House Coordinator for Arms Control and Weapons of Mass Destruction
 Scott Sullivan (1979), WorldCom Inc.'s former chief financial officer, architect of its financial collapse
 Joseph M. Tucci, Chairman of the Board, CEO, & President of EMC Corporation

References

External links
 
Bethlehem Central School District
Alumni website

Public high schools in Albany County, New York